Modern Marriage is a 1923 American silent crime drama film directed by Lawrence C. Windom and Victor Heerman. It starred Francis X. Bushman and Beverly Bayne in one of their last appearances together.

Cast

Preservation status
A print of Modern Marriage is preserved at the British Film Institute National Film and Television Archive in London.

References

External links

1923 films
American silent feature films
Films based on short fiction
American black-and-white films
American crime drama films
1923 crime drama films
Surviving American silent films
Films directed by Lawrence C. Windom
1920s American films
Silent American drama films